Franz Anton Zell (28 February 1866 in Munich - 10 August 1961) was a German architect and folklorist.

Notes

External links 
 http://d-nb.info/gnd/119428415/about/html

1866 births
1961 deaths
Architects from Munich
German folklorists
German male non-fiction writers